The Asiago-DLR Asteroid Survey (ADAS; obs. code: 209) was an astronomical survey conducted in the early 2000s to search for comets and asteroids, with special emphasis on near-Earth objects. The Minor Planet Center directly credits ADAS with the discovery of more than 200 minor planets after 2001.

Description 

It was a joint venture between the Department of Astronomy of the University of Padua (using the Schmidt telescope at the Cima Ekar Observing Station) and the German Aerospace Center's Institute of Space Sensor Technology and Planetary Exploration at Berlin-Adlershof, Germany. ADAS has IAU observatory code 209. Co-located with the Asiago Astrophysical Observatory, it conducted observations from 2001 to 2002. Principal investigators for the survey were Cesare Barbieri (at Padua/Asiago) and Gerhard Hahn (at DLR Berlin-Adlershof). The project worked in collaboration with the Uppsala-DLR Asteroid Survey (UDAS).

List of discovered minor planets

See also 
 Cima Ekar Observing Station
 List of asteroid-discovering observatories
 
 
List of near-Earth object observation projects

References

External links 
 

Asteroid surveys

Astronomical discoveries by institution
Minor-planet discovering observatories